The Good Girl Gone Bad Tour was the second overall and first world concert tour by Barbadian singer Rihanna, in support of her third studio album  Good Girl Gone Bad (2007). The setlist was composed of songs mostly from Good Girl Gone Bad but also included some songs from her first two albums. Akon was selected as the opening act for the Canadian dates of the North American leg, while Ciara and David Jordan supported the UK dates of the European leg. Chris Brown joined the tour during the Oceanian leg.

The show featured Rihanna wearing revealing leather costumes during each show. Many changes were made to the set list throughout the tour. The original set list features a cover of Bob Marley's "Is This Love" and during the European leg of the tour, the set list was shortened to fifteen songs. In the third set list of the Oceanian and Asian leg, the show ended with an encore. A DVD of the Manchester concert at the Manchester Arena titled Good Girl Gone Bad Live was released on June 17, 2008.

Background and development 

The tour, directed and choreographed by Tina Landon, was the first tour headlined by Rihanna. It presented a whole new image as she wore very provocative and revealing leather costumes during each show. The stage was elaborate, consisting of a large set of stairs; two large LCD screens which showed images of Rihanna and special-made clips during the concert; and six slim LCD screens which were evenly spaced out, with three on the left and three on the right. The stage also consisted of thousands of lights which flashed in different colors, there was also a huge LCD screen in the middle of the stage which was mainly focused on Rihanna performing. The stage was packed with pyrotechnics and different on-stage props which Rihanna and the dancers used during their performances. Her back-up singers and band were on either side on the stage. During the Australia leg of the tour the stage also featured a small rising platform at the front center of the stage. For "Disturbia" she started high in the air on the platform, and rose on it again during "Unfaithful".

Akon was selected as the opening act for the tour in Canada during North America leg. The rest of the shows during the North American leg didn't have a supporting act. Ciara opened shows for Rihanna on all UK dates in December and David Jordan opened for her on all March UK dates. Adam Tensta joined Rihanna on her March 2008 European dates. Chris Brown joined Rihanna and performed a full set list at the Australia, New Zealand and Philippines leg of the tour. In Mexico City Mexican pop star María José opened the show with a four-song set: her first three singles and her then brand-new single, "No Soy Una Señora", and the Spanish Singer, David Bisbal sing with Rihanna the Spanish remix of "Hate That I Love You" in Mexico City. In December 2007, Rihanna cancelled the Good Girl Gone Bad concert in Nottingham, Birmingham and Bournemouth at very short notice under doctors orders. The Birmingham and Nottingham concerts were eventually rescheduled. During the Sydney, Australia concert on November 7, 2008, Rihanna ran off stage while performing "Umbrella" along with tourmate Chris Brown. TMZ reported that Rihanna may have felt ill due to air conditioning problem in the arena. The shows for February 12 and 13 in Asia were cancelled following Brown's assault on Rihanna.

Critical reception 
Mike Usinger of The Georgia Straight gave a mixed review of the concert in Vancouver at the GM Place saying, "the Barbados-born knockout has plenty to learn about keeping an audience engaged." However, Usinger commented that the "kindest thing you can say about Rihanna is that she's shown some improvement since her last visit. For a start, she no longer seems tone-deaf." Jason Macneil of Canadian Online Explorer gave a positive review of the concert during the show at Molson Amphitheatre, saying "the singer made a rather eye-popping impression, opening with Pon de Replay and clad in a sexy, dominatrix-like studded black leather ensemble." During a show planned for February 13 in Malaysia, Malaysia's conservative Islamic party recommended that Rihanna's concert tour should be banned from performing due to her skimpy outfits. The tour also received positive reviews for the live performance of Rihanna and the whole concept and outfits. Cheryl Leong of MTV Southeast Asia commented on the concert saying, "I did enjoy myself a whole lot at the concert. It just wasn't the most mindblowing. Nevertheless, she did what she does best, which is to bring out an entire collection of #1 singles 'live'."

Broadcast and recordings 

On September 24, 2007, the show from Bell Centre in Montreal, Quebec, Canada, was recorded and made available for online broadcast on MSN Music. It quickly became popular and broke records, as it was viewed over one million times online in the first week only. Rihanna's concert was the most-streamed show by a single artist on MSN Music in 2007. Rihanna's concert in Ischgl, Austria, On December 1, 2007, was taped and aired on Austrian national television. The concert was free. The show from Manchester Arena in Manchester, England, on December 6, 2007, was recorded and later released on June 17, 2008, as a live DVD titled Good Girl Gone Bad Live. The DVD also included the documentary of Rihanna and her band's journey and life on tour. The tour was also due to air on Channel 4 Christmas Day 2008[?]. On November 16, 2008, the concert held in Fort Bonifacio in Manila, Philippines, reached an audience of more than 70,000. The concert was sponsored by MTV Philippines and Globe Telecom.

Opening acts 
 Akon (North America only)
 Kardinal Offishall (Canada only)
 Ray Lavender (London, Ontario, Canada)
 Kat DeLuna (Lincroft)
 Ciara (Europe only)
 DanceX (Selected Dates)
 David Jordan (Europe only)
 Chris Brown (the Philippines, Oceania)
 María José (Mexico)
 Sistanova (Germany)

Set list

Shows

Cancelled shows

Box office score data

Personnel 
Crew on the road
 Tina Landon (director & choreographer)
 Antony Randall (Tour Director, Production director)
 JP Firmin (tour manager)
 Mark Dawson (security)
 Fankie Fuccile (stage manager)
 Alex MacLeod (tour accountant)
 Dave Berrera (stage tech)
 Alex Skowron (lighting director)
 TJ Thompson (rigger)
 Simon James (carpenter)
 David Kirkwood (front-of-house engineer)
 Ricky 'Bongos' Galecki (monitor engineer)
 Elizabeth Springer (wardrobe)

Band
 Rihanna (lead vocals)
 Kevin Hastings (keyboards)
 Eric Smith (bass)
 David Haddon (drums)
 Adam Ross (lead guitar)
 Richard Fortus (rhythm guitar September 2008–February 2009)
 Ashleigh Haney (backing vocals)
 Erica King (backing vocals)

Dancers
 Victoria Parsons (dance captain)
 Rachel Markarian
 Bryan Tanaka
 Julius Law

Styling
 Ursula Stephen (hair)
 Mylah Morales (makeup)
 Lysa Cooper (stylist)
 Mariel Haenn (stylist)
 Hollywood (stylist)

Notes

References 

Rihanna concert tours
2007 concert tours
2008 concert tours
2009 concert tours